James Rowberry (born 26 April 1985) is a Welsh football manager who was most recently in charge of EFL League Two team Newport County. He began his coaching career at an early age, and at 29 years old became one of the youngest people to ever gain the UEFA Pro Licence. Rowberry has previously been a youth coach at Newport and Cardiff City, where he was made first-team coach in 2014.

Coaching career
Rowberry played youth football with Bristol City and Newport County, who he joined aged 16. He retired as a player aged 21, choosing to concentrate on his coaching career. He grew up a small distance from Rodney Parade, Newport's current stadium, and was the mascot of Newport aged five. Rowberry gained his UEFA Pro Licence in 2014 aged 29, making him one of the youngest people to complete the highest qualification badges in Europe. Upon gaining his badges, he was described as "one of the brightest young coaches coming through" by Football Association of Wales technical director Osian Roberts.

He joined Newport in 2009, working with the first team and development team, before moving to Cardiff City in 2013 to work with the club's academy. He also worked with the Welsh Football Trust as a football development officer, and later as a coach educator. Following the departure of Ole Gunnar Solskjær as Cardiff manager, Rowberry was made a first team coach under new manager Russell Slade, who described Rowberry as passionate and enthusiastic about coaching. When Slade himself left the job in 2016, Rowberry was among the candidates to take over the role. He would go on to work with Paul Trollope and Neil Warnock, and Rowberry says that he learned "pure coaching" from Slade and Trollope, while under Warnock he learned "pure management". He also credits Mick McCarthy with advising him on the role of being a manager prior to taking over at Newport.

Managerial career
On 19 October 2021, Rowberry was appointed manager of his hometown team, EFL League Two club Newport County, with the team 13th in the league after 13 matches of the 2021–22 season. He was given a contract until summer 2024, and took over from caretaker manager Wayne Hatswell, who had managed the club for four unbeaten league matches following the departure of manager Michael Flynn, with Rowberry saying he had "big shoes to fill" due to the success Flynn had at the club. Hatswell was retained as assistant manager, but resigned his position on 22 February 2022. On the same day, Cardiff coach Carl Serrant was appointed as assistant to Rowberry. Newport finished the season in 11th place in League Two. On 10 October 2022 Rowberry was sacked with Newport in 18th place in League Two after 13 league matches of the 2022–23 season. Serrant was also sacked Sporting Director Darren Kelly took the role of Newport County caretaker manager.

Personal life
In August 2022, Rowberry revealed that he considers himself 'fortunate to be here' having had a pacemaker fitted following a routine check-up showed led to him being diagnosed with third-degree atrioventricular heart block.

Managerial statistics

References

1985 births
Living people
Footballers from Newport, Wales
Welsh footballers
Association football midfielders
Welsh football managers
Newport County A.F.C. managers
English Football League managers
Cardiff City F.C. non-playing staff